Events in the year 2019 in the Faroe Islands.

Incumbents 
 Monarch – Margrethe II
 High Commissioner – Lene Moyell Johansen
 Prime Minister – Aksel V. Johannesen (until 16 September), Bárður á Steig Nielsen (from 16 September)

Events

April 
 5 June – 2019 Danish general election
 31 August – 2019 Faroese general election

Sports 
 19 March – 26 October: 2019 Faroe Islands Premier League

Deaths

References 

 
2010s in the Faroe Islands
Years of the 21st century in the Faroe Islands
Faroe Islands
Faroe Islands